"It's Time" is the debut single by American rock band Imagine Dragons,  released on February 6, 2012, as the lead single from the band's first major label EP, Continued Silence. Later that year the song was included on the band's first full album Night Visions. The song had already been included on the band's independently released EP It's Time (2011), and it had been available on YouTube since 2010.

The song's production was handled by Brandon Darner, and its lyrics describe the narrator's resistance to change in the face of great turmoil. The single was created without Daniel Platzman who joined the group later, and it includes contributions from early band members Andrew and Brittany Tolman. 

After the song was covered on Glee in September 2012 and gained heavy rotation in commercials and television shows, it reached number 15 on the Billboard Hot 100, making it the band's first Top 40 single. It also hit number 4 on the Alternative Songs chart and number 3 on the Rock Songs chart. Lasting 32 weeks, it had the longest run on the Alternative Songs Top 10 in 2012. The single reached the top 10 in Austria (number 6), Czech Republic (number 10), Ireland (number 9), India (number 17) Japan (number 7), Billboard Pop Songs (number 10), and Portugal (number 6) and peaked at number 23 in the United Kingdom. It was certified Platinum by the RIAA and CRIA, and Platinum by the ARIA. It was also nominated for Best Rock Video at the 2012 MTV Video Music Awards.

Background
Dan Reynolds told The Huffington Post about the writing process for the song:

There's so many times you wake up at 3 a.m., grab a recorder on the iPhone and say something – a lyrical idea or melody – and then you lay it out in logic later on and sometimes it makes no sense. We sat with 'It's Time' for a year or year-and-a-half. Sometimes you just have to let a song sit for awhile. There's just something really special about it. I wrote it during a very hard time in my life. I had dropped out of college, and I was just sitting down at my computer, and I came up with this rhythm. And the words just wrote themselves. I knew I had something special coming. When a song is most honest and most raw that’s when you know you’re doing something right. A lot of my favorite artists are able to be in touch with their problems and put it through melodies. It happens all the time with bands."

Music video
The music video debuted on April 17, 2012, on all MTV affiliates and the band was named PUSH Artist of the Week and later featured on PUSH Live. A first teaser released March 28, 2012.  The video also reached number 1 on Yahoo Music's Top Videos.

The video starts with the band walking through a barren wasteland beneath a dark and ominous looking sky.  The sky begins to grow more turbulent as the band walks past flags and boat wreckage, a destroyed bridge, and dead trees.  Bassist McKee opens a box he has been carrying and a pale light glows from within. The band removes a pebble-sized, glowing orb from the box. The band members dig a hole for it with their hands, and then drop the orb into the ground. Lead singer Dan Reynolds then shouts, and in the next scene the band members are shown running away from their dig site. A large explosion throws Reynolds into the air where he seems to levitate (similarly to the Continued Silence album cover). Finally, the sky begins to part and the sunlight shines through.

The music video was produced by Todd Makurath and directed by Anthony Leonardi III.  Ian Clemmer, who created some of the visual effects, wrote on his website that he "was asked to create big, large scale smoke explosions in a short amount of time, these are the end shots of the video ...."

About two months after the original music video, another one was created for the Jailbreaks remix.

Usage in media
Voted by Entertainment Weekly readers number 8 on "The Best Singles of 2012".
Featured in BYUtv's AUDIO-FILES pilot episode about the band
Featured in Gossip Girl (season 6) in the series finale episode New York, I Love You XOXO
Featured in the theatrical trailer for the 2012 film adaptation of the 1999 coming-of-age novel The Perks of Being a Wallflower.
 The song was featured in the "Explorer TOP 125" ad for the National Geographic Channel.
 The song was used for promotional clip for French television channel D8.
 In 2012, Darren Criss (as his character Blaine Anderson) covered "It's Time" in the season 4 premier of the musical TV series Glee. The song also charted on the Billboard Hot 100 at number 15 as well as the Canadian Hot 100 at number 30.
 The song is used in commercials of the Chilean telecommunications company VTR.

Live performances
On July 16, 2012, Imagine Dragons performed "It's Time" on The Tonight Show with Jay Leno.  They also performed the song live on Jimmy Kimmel Live! on September 4, 2012 and on Conan on January 9, 2013. They also performed the song on Late Night with Jimmy Fallon on October 29, 2012, notable for being broadcast during Hurricane Sandy. As a result, they performed the song to an empty audience, with only the cast and crew of Late Night being present. The band also performed and singer Dan Reynolds was interviewed on Norwegian and Swedish television show Skavlan on February 1, 2013.

Imagine Dragons plays "It's Time" at its live concerts, and although it's a "bigger single", the band plays it early in their set list rather than last, as might be expected.

On December 5, 2014, the group played an acoustic version at the end of The Game Awards (the inaugural ceremonies of said award show), with Nintendo composer Koji Kondo playing on the piano as part of a medley of music from The Legend of Zelda series.

Personnel
Dan Reynolds – vocals
Wayne Sermon – guitar, mandolin
Ben McKee – bass guitar
Andrew Tolman – drums, backing vocals, acoustic rhythm guitar
Brittany Tolman – keyboard, backing vocals

Track listing

Charts

Weekly charts

Year-end charts

Decade-end charts

Certifications

Accolades

Release history

References

Imagine Dragons songs
2012 debut singles
Song recordings produced by Alex da Kid
2010 songs
Kidinakorner singles
Interscope Records singles
Songs written by Wayne Sermon
Songs written by Dan Reynolds (musician)
Songs written by Daniel Platzman
Songs written by Ben McKee